Joseph   appears as Dean of Armagh in 1257.

References

Deans of Armagh
13th-century Irish Roman Catholic priests